Francisco 'Paco' Sanz is a Spanish actor. He has appeared in more than eighty films since 1964. He is known for The Relentless Four (1965), El hombre que mató a Billy el Niño (1967), Cervantes (1981) and Teresa de Jesús (1984). He has worked with Miguel Fernández Milá, Tomás Blanco, Manuel Alexandre, Federico de Urrutia, Fausto Tozzi, Antonio Pica, José Orjas, Gloria Milland, José Mallorquí and Álvaro de Luna.

Selected filmography

References

External links 

Spanish male film actors
Year of birth missing (living people)
Possibly living people
Living people